= Mansion of Chizhovs =

Coordinates: 55.7393°N 37.6189°E

Mansion of Chizhov
- Городская усадьба Чижовых
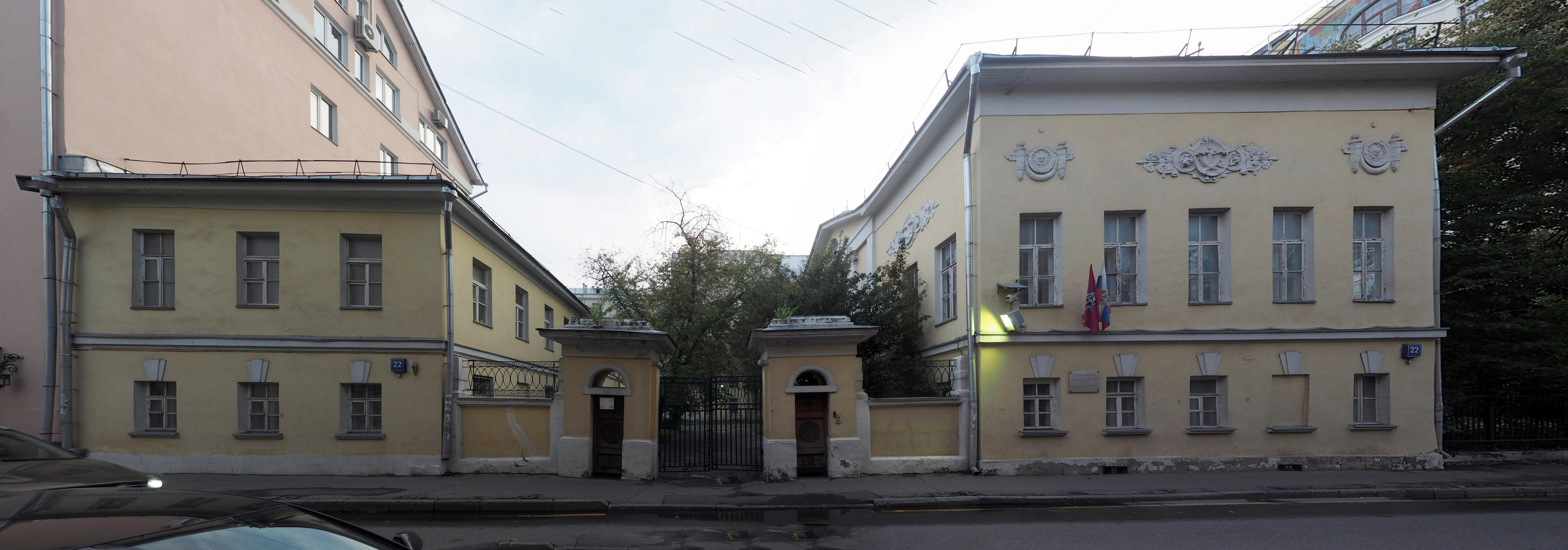
- Location: Moscow, Staromonetny pereulok, house 20, building 1, 2, 3

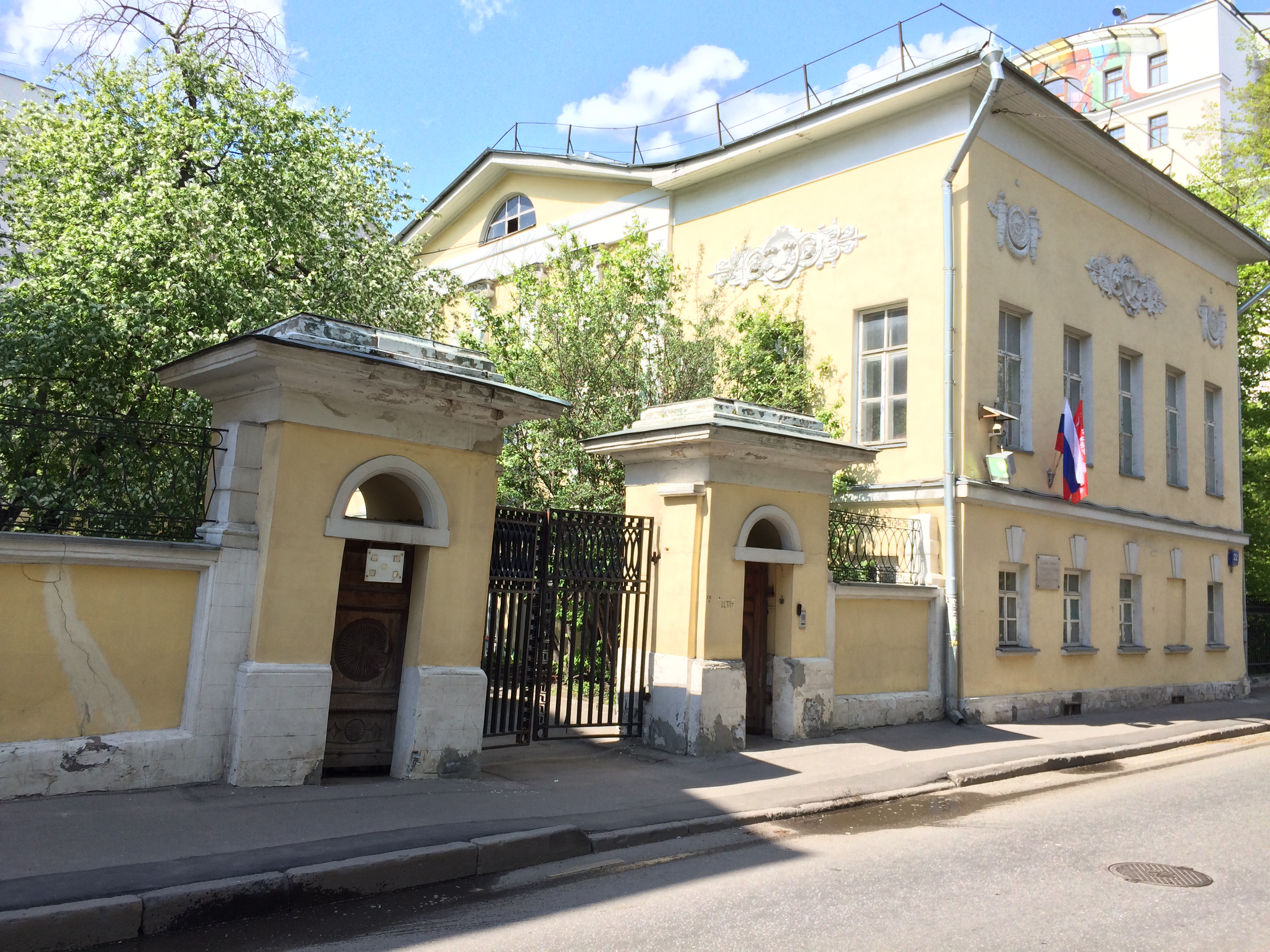
Main house and gates

The mansion of Chizhovs (Chizyovs) (Russian: Городская усадьба Чижовых (Чижёвых)) is a complex of buildings in the center of Moscow (Staromonetny pereulok, house 20, building 1, 2, 3). Built in the early 19th century in Empire style on the basis of earlier buildings. At present the estate is occupied by the Geological Institute of the Russian Academy of Sciences. The city manor has the status of an object of cultural heritage of federal significance.

== History ==
The house of the "merchants' wives Afimya and Irina Chizhyovs" appeared in Staromonetny Lane at the beginning of the 19th century. At the heart of the manor complex are earlier buildings that have not been dated. Later, an extension was made to the main house, and the left wing was built on the second floor and lengthened. The estate was acquired by the end of the 1830s.

The main house almost completely preserved its external appearance, except that in the 1920s the windows of the lower floor were grown. It stands with its butt to the side street, the central part is marked with a portico. The facades of the mansion are decorated with stucco bas-reliefs. Between the left wing and the main house - a classical fence with wrought iron gates and white stone pylons. Preserved metal umbrellas above the porches, restored by restorers wooden gate with carvings, typical for the 19th century. The interiors of the mansion have been lost. In the backyard of the estate there is a service building (19th century).

In the Soviet era, the estate housed the Lithosphere Institute of the USSR Academy of Sciences. On the facade of the service building of the manor there are memorial plaques for the founder of the institute, Academician A. V. Sidorenko, and also academicians N. A. Bogdanov and A. L. Yanshin. Now the estate is occupied by the Geological Institute of the Russian Academy of Sciences.
